Monika Haselsberger (born 23 September 1976) is an Austrian sport shooter who competed in the 2000 Summer Olympics and in the 2004 Summer Olympics.

References

1976 births
Living people
Austrian female sport shooters
ISSF rifle shooters
Olympic shooters of Austria
Shooters at the 2000 Summer Olympics
Shooters at the 2004 Summer Olympics
World record holders in shooting